Raymond Baratto (born 23 January 1934 in Amnéville, Moselle, France) is a former French footballer. He was part of France's squad for the 1960 Summer Olympics.

Football career
 Stade de Reims (1955–1961) (28 matches and 2 goals in Division 1)
 Lille OSC (October 1961-Juin 1962)

Championships

 French national champion in 1958 and 1960 (as part of the Stade de Reims team)

References

External links
 Official website

1934 births
Living people
People from Amnéville
French people of Italian descent
French footballers
Stade de Reims players
Lille OSC players
Ligue 1 players
Olympic footballers of France
Footballers at the 1960 Summer Olympics
Association football midfielders
Sportspeople from Moselle (department)
Footballers from Grand Est